Nevermore is the debut studio album by American heavy metal band Nevermore, released on February 14, 1995 by Century Media Records. It was singer Warrel Dane and bassist Jim Sheppard's first release after disbanding their previous band, Sanctuary, in 1992. Having recruited drummer Van Williams and former Sanctuary touring guitarist Jeff Loomis, they formed the band Nevermore and began anew.

This was Nevermore's first and only album to feature original drummer Mark Arrington. Despite not being credited as the drummer on the album, he did play on half of the tracks.

A music video was produced for the song "What Tomorrow Knows". It would also be the sole track from Nevermore to be featured on Manifesto of Nevermore, the band's 2009 greatest hits compilation.

Track listing

Personnel
Nevermore
Warrel Dane – vocals
Jeff Loomis – guitar
Jim Sheppard – bass
Van Williams – drums on tracks 2, 3, 5 and 7

Additional
Christine Rinehart – backing vocals on "Garden of Gray"
Mark Arrington – drums on all other tracks

Production
Neil Kernon – recording and mixing
Joe Gastwirt – mastering
Perry Cunningham – remastering (2006 reissue)

References

1995 debut albums
Nevermore albums
Century Media Records albums
Albums produced by Neil Kernon
Albums recorded at Robert Lang Studios